CIAR may refer to:

Canadian Institute for Advanced Research, a virtual institute dedicated to collaborative advanced research and scholarship of relevance to the Canadian and global community
Center for Indoor Air Research, a non-profit organization established by the tobacco industry in 1988 
Cornell International Affairs Review, a biannual, peer-reviewed student-run academic journal at Cornell University
Rozas Airborne Research Center, an aerodrome in Castro de Rei, Galicia, Spain